"Love Ain't No Stranger" is a power ballad by the English hard rock/heavy metal group Whitesnake, and it is taken from the band's U.S.-breakthrough album Slide It In. One of the group's best known songs, it's been included in multiple multi-artist compilation albums as well as in various media from Whitesnake's own labels. Particularly well-received in the context of the 1980s heavy music boom in the Anglosphere, various music critics have praised its composition.

"Love Ain't No Stranger" is a staple of the band's live performances. Due to its popularity among fans, Whitesnake has performed the song over eight hundred times as of December 2022, making it one of the group's top five most played pieces.

The song charted at number 44 on the UK Singles Chart and 34 on the U.S. Mainstream rock charts. Eduardo Rivadavia of AllMusic described the song as "one of the decade's greatest power ballads, bar none."

Recording
The song starts with keyboardist Jon Lord's keyboards with emotional vocal delivery from singer David Coverdale. The song keeps a slow tempo until the guitars and drums kick in when the song tempo drastically changes and becomes a hard driving rock song. The slow tempo "ballady" section doesn't emerge again until the very middle and very end of the song. According to the 25th Anniversary Edition booklet of Slide It In, the keyboard intro was originally written for guitars, but was eventually switched to keyboards. Also, Coverdale told in the edition's booklet that drummer Cozy Powell once told the singer that "Love Ain't No Stranger" was the best track he'd ever played drums on.

Music video
A music video was also made for the song, which depicts the band performing the song at a mock concert, with scenes of Coverdale running after an unknown woman. At the end of the video, Coverdale climbs on to a truck and hugs the woman, but as he turns around he sees that the woman has switched and that the woman he was after is standing on the ground. As the truck, along with Coverdale on it, starts to drive away Coverdale stares at the woman as she disappears into the mist.

Track listing

Personnel
 David Coverdale – lead vocals, percussion
 Micky Moody – guitars (UK version)
 John Sykes – guitars (US version)
 Mel Galley – guitars, backing vocals
 Colin Hodgkinson – bass (UK version)
 Neil Murray – bass (US version)
 Cozy Powell – drums
 Jon Lord – keyboards

Charts

See also

1984 in music
Whitesnake discography

References

1980s ballads
1984 songs
Glam metal ballads
Liberty Records singles
Songs written by David Coverdale
Songs written by Mel Galley
Whitesnake songs